Henriette Herz Park (German: Henriette-Herz-Park) is a park near Potsdamer Platz in Berlin, Germany.

See also

 List of parks and gardens in Berlin

References

External links
 

Parks in Berlin